Monponsett Pond Seaplane Base  is a privately owned, public-use seaplane base located two miles (3 km) northwest of the central business district of Halifax, a town in Plymouth County, Massachusetts, United States.

Facilities and aircraft 
Monponsett Pond Seaplane Base has two landing areas:
 Runway 10/28: 3,200 x 300 ft. (975 x 91 m), Surface: Water
 Runway 17/35: 4,600 x 500 ft. (1,402 x 152 m), Surface: Water

For the 12-month period ending May 1, 2005, the airport had 162 general aviation aircraft operations.

References

External links 

Seaplane bases in the United States
Airports in Plymouth County, Massachusetts